James Ormond (born 18 June 1973) is a British former alpine skier who competed in the 1998 Winter Olympics.

References

1973 births
Living people
British male alpine skiers
Olympic alpine skiers of Great Britain
Alpine skiers at the 1998 Winter Olympics
Place of birth missing (living people)